"Cheatin' on a Cheater" is a song that was originally performed by American country music artist Loretta Lynn. It was released as a single in September 1980 via MCA Records.

Background and reception 
"Cheatin' on a Cheater" was recorded at the Bradley's Barn in September 1980. Located in Mount Juliet, Tennessee, the session was produced by renowned country music producer Owen Bradley. Two additional tracks were recorded during this session, including the single's B-side "Until I Met You".

"Cheatin' on a Cheater" reached number twenty on the Billboard Hot Country Singles survey in 1980. Additionally, reached a minor position in Canada, peaking at number twenty one on the Canadian RPM Country Songs chart during this same period. It was included on her studio album, Lookin' Good (1980).

Track listings 
7" vinyl single
 "Cheatin' on a Cheater" 
 "Until I Met You"

Charts

References 

1980 songs
1980 singles
MCA Records singles
Loretta Lynn songs
Song recordings produced by Owen Bradley